Emilbek Abakirov (18 March 1929 – 22 January 2022) was a Soviet-Kyrgyz politician. A member of the Communist Party, he served in the Congress of People's Deputies of the Soviet Union from 1989 to 1991. He died on 22 January 2022, at the age of 92.

References

1929 births
2022 deaths
Communist Party of the Soviet Union members
Members of the Congress of People's Deputies of the Soviet Union
Recipients of the Order of the Red Banner of Labour
People from Naryn Region